Superfudge is a children's novel by Judy Blume, published in 1980. It is the sequel to Tales of a Fourth Grade Nothing and Otherwise Known as Sheila the Great and is the third in the Fudge series.

Plot 
The Hatcher family has a new baby daughter in the beginning. Several months before they temporarily move from New York City to Princeton, New Jersey, she is born, named Tamara Roxanne, and called "The Baby" for weeks. Peter's 4-year-old brother, Fudge, is extremely jealous of her, who earns the nickname "Tootsie" from their mother Ann's cute speak and their grandmother Muriel's favorite old song. Peter deals with the fallout from Fudge's various problems, which include a spat with his teacher who refuses to use the name "Fudge". When she refuses to do so, he kicks her in the shin. He also attempts to get rid of Tootsie and is famous for his constant desire to involve himself in Peter's activities, especially with Peter's new friend, Alex Santo. In the end, the Hatchers decide to move back to New York City, a decision punctuated by Tootsie's first word which she learns while undergoing a diaper change.

Awards
 Won – Books I Love Best Yearly: Early Readers Award (1990)-1991

Television

A television series based on Superfudge entitled Fudge ran from 1995–1997. "Fudge Meets Ratface" was one of the episodes based on Chapter 6 of Superfudge, which was called "Farley Drexel Meets Ratface". Another episode, called "Uncle Feather", was based on Chapter 7: A Very Cultured Bird.

Feature film 
In 2022, an animated feature film based on the book was put into production for Disney+, produced by Disney Television Animation and the Russo brothers's AGBO, with Amos Vernon and Nunzio Randazzo writing.

References

External links
 Judy Blume's website

1980 American novels
American children's novels
BILBY Award-winning works
E. P. Dutton books
Fudge series
Novels by Judy Blume
Novels set in New Jersey
Sequel novels
1980 children's books